Piero Mazzarella (2 March 1928 – 25 October 2013) was an Italian actor. He appeared in more than thirty films from 1962 to 2008.

Selected filmography

References

External links 

1928 births
2013 deaths
Italian male film actors